The Vyngypur (also: Вынгапур, Вэнга-Пур, Вэнгапур) is a river in Yamalo-Nenets Autonomous Okrug, Russia, a right tributary of the Pyakupur. It starts on the northern slope of the Siberian Uvaly Hills, about 60 km east of Noyabrsk, and flows north through a boggy terrain. The river has more than 300 tributaries along its way, most of them short, but more than 60 of them exceed 10 km in length. Two main tributaries are Apakapur (left) and Vyngyyakha (right).

Melting snow provides the key water source for the river. High water period usually begins in May, sometimes at the end of April, and is finished by the second half of June-first days of July.

References

External links
Реки Ямала. Вынгапур - info at purpe.ru

Rivers of Yamalo-Nenets Autonomous Okrug